The Edward M. Kennedy Institute for the United States Senate (also known as the Kennedy Institute) is a non-profit civic engagement and educational institution on Columbia Point in the Dorchester neighborhood of Boston, Massachusetts, next to the John F. Kennedy Presidential Library and Museum on the University of Massachusetts Boston campus. Named for long-time U.S. Senator Ted Kennedy, the institute contains a full-scale reproduction of the United States Senate Chamber, a replica of Kennedy's Washington, D.C. office, and digital exhibits. The organization includes the Kennedy Home in Hyannis Port, which was donated to the institute in 2012 as part of a "mission of educating the public about the U.S. government, invigorating public discourse, emphasizing the importance of bipartisanship, and inspiring the next generation of citizens and leaders to engage in the public square." The Kennedy Institute is, along with the Bipartisan Policy Center and the Orrin G. Hatch Foundation, a co-sponsor of The Senate Project, whose goal is, through hosting a series of Oxford-style debates between leading U.S. Senators, to reintroduce the culture of seeking common ground and bipartisan consensus that has been the essence of the Senate since it was conceived in 1789.

Mission
The Edward M. Kennedy Institute for the United States Senate is dedicated to educating the public about the important role of the Senate in the United States government, encouraging participatory democracy, invigorating civil discourse, and inspiring the next generation of citizens and leaders to engage in the civic life of their communities.

Exhibits

The Senate Chamber
The building houses the only full-scale reproduction of the United States Senate Chamber. Visitors are encouraged to explore the space with the help of exhibit interpreters and participate in the institute's signature daily programs, such as Today's Vote and Great Senate Debates.
 Today's Vote ー During Today's Vote, visitors have the chance to cast their vote on a bill inspired by real legislation and related to the Issue of the Day; both the bill and the issue are changed and updated regularly.
 Great Senate Debates ー Blending live performance with historic film footage and archival images, this 20-minute family program looks at the context and importance of crucial turning points in Senate history and reflects on their impact on our lives today.

Digital exhibits
The exhibit halls feature technology-driven projected displays that immerse visitors in the history of the Senate through exhibits such as What is the Senate?, Traditions of the Senate, and People of the Senate. In addition, the halls include interactive exhibits, such as How a Bill Becomes a Law, where visitors work together to negotiate and select ice cream sundae toppings, vote on bills, override vetoes, and practice the skills needed to guide legislation through Congress.

Senator’s Office
This exhibit features a full-scale replica of Senator Kennedy's Washington, D.C., office, where visitors, equipped with provided tablets, are able to explore the stories behind pieces of the collection.

Public programs and special events
The institute offers a series of public programs and special events hosted in Boston and Washington, D.C. on local and national issues. These programs are open to the public.

Getting to the Point
The Getting to the Point series convenes individuals with diverse perspectives to discuss current issues and the challenges the United States government is facing. Getting to the Point takes on various formats from town halls to keynote lectures and panel discussions, and showcases speakers from all walks of life. Since opening, the institute has hosted a variety of speakers ranging from Senate Majority Leader Mitch McConnell and Supreme Court Justice Stephen Breyer to the late Congressman John Lewis and Boston Red Sox Hall of Fame pitcher Pedro Martínez.

Across the Aisle
This series brings together government leaders with disparate ideologies, from different political parties who are collaborating on a common cause. In moderated discussions, Across the Aisle highlights the type of civil discourse, negotiation, collaboration, and leadership that leads to solutions for pressing problems. The series features members of Congress, governors, mayors, and other elected officials and both national and local issues.

Oral History Project
The Edward M. Kennedy Oral History Project, created in partnership with the Miller Center of Public Affairs at the University of Virginia, was released in September 2015. The project is a compilation of interviews from current and former members of the Senate, House, administration officials, foreign leaders, Senate staff, issue advocates, journalists, family, and friends documenting Senator Kennedy's service. The institute has hosted a speaker series that draws on this resource to highlight current and future national issues before the U.S. Senate.

Educational programs
The Kennedy Institute offers a comprehensive set of non-partisan civic education classes and programs for students in grades K-12, as well as for college and graduate students and lifelong learners in adult-education classes. Programs are available both in-person at the institute's facility on Columbia Point in Boston, taking full advantage of its unique full-scale replica of the United States Senate chamber, and also as online.  The Kennedy Institute's programs are suitable for social studies, government, civics, and American History classes.

The Kennedy Institute offers its online programming at varied times as a way to maximize access to its civic education offerings for students from other states.

Layout, location, and design

Layout
The institute's facility is a 68,000 square foot (6,317 m2) building designed by Rafael Viñoly, targeting Leadership in Energy and Environmental Design (LEED) specifications for sustainable building. The centerpiece of the institute is a full-scale recreation of the Senate Chamber. The halls lining the Chamber are known as the Chamber Surround, and feature the majority of the institute's exhibits. The institute also features a replica of Senator Kennedy's Washington, D.C. office, a Special Exhibits gallery, an Orientation Theater, and three technologically equipped studios for educational programs and breakout sessions. The institute also includes a café, a gift shop, and a coat check.

Location
The institute is located on Columbia Point in the Dorchester neighborhood of Boston, Massachusetts. The institute is on the campus of the University of Massachusetts Boston, adjacent to the John F. Kennedy Presidential Library and Museum, and next door to the Massachusetts Archives and Commonwealth Museum. The institute can be reached from nearby Interstate 93 or by taking the Red Line or the Commuter Rail to JFK/UMass station and boarding the free shuttle bus (#1) that drops off in front of the institute.

Design and technology
The institute's concept, design, and production are the result of a collaboration between Senator Edward M. Kennedy, his wife Vicki Reggie Kennedy, and Ed Schlossberg of ESI Design. During the production process, Control Group was brought on for software development, Richard Lewis Media Group for media elements, Electrosonic for projection technology, and Gigantic Mechanic for game mechanics.

History

Construction, dedication, and opening
A groundbreaking ceremony was held on April 8, 2011. The institute was dedicated by President Barack Obama on March 30, 2015, with Vice President Joe Biden and First Lady Michelle Obama in attendance. The institute opened to the public on March 31, 2015.

Cost and operations
The cost of the institution was $78 million in 2011, with $38 million in federal funding and a $60 million endowment that helps to pay for the $10–12 million annual operating budget of the institute.

Leadership
Adam G. Hinds, a former Massachusetts state senator and former United Nations negotiator based in the Middle East, became CEO of the Kennedy Institute in September 2022.   
Sue Heilman served as Interim Executive Director from March 2020 through September 2022.

The institute was previously led by Dr. Jean F. MacCormack from 2014 to 2017, Andrew Tarsy from 2012 to 2014, and Peter Meade from 2009 to 2012. It was announced on November 4, 2019, "with mixed emotions" that the institute's president, Mary K. Grant, Ph.D., who only assumed leadership in 2018 would be leaving within the month.

Kennedy Cape House
In 2012, the Kennedy family donated the main house of the historic Kennedy Compound in Hyannis Port to the institute fulfilling a promise made by Senator Kennedy to his mother, Rose, to donate the house for charitable use. The institute announced that it hopes to use the house to host educational seminars and other forums, and that it eventually plans to open it to visitation by the public.

References

External links

 

Biographical museums in Massachusetts
Biographical museums in the United States
Educational buildings in Boston
Columbia Point, Boston
Dorchester, Boston
History museums in Massachusetts
History museums in the United States
Museums in Boston
Museums in Suffolk County, Massachusetts
Non-profit organizations based in Boston
Ted Kennedy
Tourist attractions in Dorchester, Boston
United States Senate
University of Massachusetts Boston